is a Japanese anime series produced by Tatsunoko Production. The series was created as part of the studio's 55th anniversary celebration.

Synopsis
A kingdom full of smiles on a star far away from the earth. Princess Yūki Soleil is twelve years old and it's about time she's sensitive. She cries, laughs and sometimes flutters every day. Wherever she is, she lives happily in the royal palace.

Faithful vassals always be around Princess Yūki Soleil. Leila Etoile, her educator. Izana Langford, who assists politics. Harold Miller, the president of the Knights. Joshua Ingram, her childhood friend's aide.

Meanwhile, Stella Shining is a 17-year-old, talented and cool soldier. But her smile never ceases. A smile is indispensable for living. This is the story of two girls born on a distant star.

Characters

The young princess and nation symbol of the Kingdom of Soleil who lost her parents when she was just an infant. She thinks it is her king's duty to make herself and everyone smile. She is an energetic girl loved by the people around her. 

A soldier belonging to the Burger Squad of the Imperial Army of Grandiga. She has a high fighting ability and is excellent as a pilot, but she lacks emotional expression. When she interacts with people, she smiles and doesn't show her true feelings to others. She joined the army to live and had no particular purpose to live, but now she is coziness in her platoon.

Yūki's childhood friend. A family of knights who protect the kingdom. He is on good terms with Yūki like his sister. He is the best playmate in the kingdom and a good understanding person. He is a bright hot-blooded man. His belief is that if someone has the spirit and guts, he can do something about it. He considers Yūki to be his mission.

Yūki's instructor. She is the only scary existence for Yūki. She is knowledgeable and strict in etiquette. She is usually quiet and she is one of the few people in the kingdom to seriously scold Yūki. However, her harshness comes from her affection for Yūki and Yūki will do my best to support her.

Current Knight Chief. He thinks Yūki like her daughter and gives her a gentle smile. He is an excellent commander who can make accurate decisions on the battlefield. He has been with Izana since he was a military academy.

A political officer who is calm, has a clear mind and has excellent ability to grasp the situation. She doesn't like the fight itself, but she thinks the fight will never stop in order to protect the peaceful life of her beloved husband and her daughter. She is vulnerable to alcohol. She has been with Harold since she was in the military academy. 

A pilot from a remote area. Lune's twin sister. She has bright and caring her sister's skin. She loves cute things. She's just that she's a rushing type and her beliefs are fierce. She is reassuring about Lune who supports her. She is a good pilot, but she knows what's going on around her and gives her instructions.

A pilot from a remote area. Yuni's twin brother. Unlike his sister Yuni, a young man with a serious and calm atmosphere. He always supports Yuni, who runs alone. He is also an excellent pilot, but he is always supporting his sister and he is good at collaborating with others.

Captain of the newly appointed Burger Squad. He has only survived the battlefield and is an excellent military man as a pilot and commander.

A Burger Squad member who longs for Stella. She is always a bright and unit mood maker. She often plays a supporting role for other members in combat.

A Burger Squad member who has fought with Stella and has an ironic shop set up diagonally. He is an excellent pilot, especially in shooting.

A serious Burger Squad member with a strong sense of justice. He seeks to prioritize carrying out his mission as a soldier. Due to his serious personality, he is inflexible. 

A Burger Squad member in charge of pilot and mechanic. He is humble and does not feel much motivated as a soldier. Therefore, he is often warned by serious Pierce, but he doesn't care at all.

Production and release

Anime
A new original anime from Tatsunoko Production was announced in commemoration for its 55th anniversary. It aired from January 4 to March 22, 2019 on Wowow, Tokyo MX, and YTV. The series is directed by Toshimasa Suzuki, with scripts written by Shinichi Inotsume, character designs by NOB-C and Naoto Nakamura, sound design by Kazuya Tanaka, and music by Tsubasa Itō. The series aired for 12 episodes. The series is simulcast on Crunchyroll outside of Asia. Sentai Filmworks licensed the anime in North America, the British Isles, and other select territories, and simulcasts the series within these regions on HIDIVE. In Australia and New Zealand, the series streamed on AnimeLab. Muse Communication licensed the series in Southeast Asia and South Asia.

Note

References

External links
Official website 

2019 anime television series debuts
Anime with original screenplays
Crunchyroll anime
Fantasy anime and manga
Fiction set in the 7th millennium or beyond
Muse Communication
Sentai Filmworks
Shōnen manga
Tatsunoko Production
Wowow original programming